The U.S Post Office and Customs House in Atlanta (also Atlanta's City Hall from 1910 to 1930) was a landmark building located on Marietta Street, occupying the block bounded by Marietta, Fairlie, Walton and Forsyth streets in the Fairlie-Poplar district of Downtown Atlanta. The building opened in 1878. In 1910 the City acquired the building and it was used as the Atlanta City Hall until 1930, after which it was razed. The lot was rebuilt in 1958 as the Fulton National Bank building, now the 55 Marietta Street building.

External links
 Photo when it was City Hall at Atlanta History Center
 Photo during demolition at Atlanta History Center

See also 
List of United States post offices

References 

Demolished buildings and structures in Atlanta
Custom houses in the United States
Post office buildings in Georgia (U.S. state)
City halls in Georgia (U.S. state)
Government buildings completed in 1878